Vladimir Torgovkin (born 26 June 1965) is a Kyrgyzstani former wrestler who competed in the 1996 Summer Olympics.

References

External links
 

1965 births
Living people
Olympic wrestlers of Kyrgyzstan
Wrestlers at the 1996 Summer Olympics
Kyrgyzstani male sport wrestlers
Kyrgyzstani people of Russian descent